Croton Township is a civil township of Newaygo County in the U.S. state of Michigan.  The population was 3,042 at the 2000 census. Known as the "Party Capital" of Mid-Michigan, Croton lies on the banks of the majestic Muskegon River. Nestled between the Croton Dam and Hardy Dam, an artificial lake is created which plays hosts to world-class fishing, boating, and natural scenery. Often, referred to as "Michigan's Secret Paradise" Croton is lauded as a quiet get away, especially during the warm summer months.

Communities
Croton is a former village in the township.  It was settled in 1840 originally called Muskegeon Forks.  It was platted in 1854 and incorporated as a village in 1870.  Its post office closed down in 1908.  It was named after Croton, New York.
Riverview is a small unincorporated community situated on the Croton Dam Pond in the Muskegon River where the Little Muskegon River joins the main stream. It is in the midst of the Manistee National Forest at  approximately 35 miles north of Grand Rapids.

Geography

The Croton Dam on the Muskegon River is located in the township.

Demographics
As of the census of 2000, there were 3,042 people, 1,222 households, and 874 families residing in the township. The racial makeup of the township was 96.84% White, 0.39% African American, 0.79% Native American, 0.13% Asian, 0.85% from other races, and 0.99% from two or more races. Hispanic or Latino of any race were 1.64% of the population.

There were 1,222 households, out of which 29.7% had children under the age of 18 living with them, 60.6% were married couples living together, 7.0% had a female householder with no husband present, and 28.4% were non-families. 24.2% of all households were made up of individuals, and 8.8% had someone living alone who was 65 years of age or older.  The average household size was 2.49 and the average family size was 2.94.

In the township the population was spread out, with 25.2% under the age of 18, 6.4% from 18 to 24, 28.3% from 25 to 44, 25.6% from 45 to 64, and 14.5% who were 65 years of age or older.  The median age was 39 years. For every 100 females, there were 104.6 males.  For every 100 females age 18 and over, there were 103.0 males.

The median income for a household in the township was $41,596, and the median income for a family was $48,229. Males had a median income of $40,219 versus $22,717 for females. The per capita income for the township was $21,036.  About 5.2% of families and 7.4% of the population were below the poverty line, including 7.9% of those under age 18 and 5.0% of those age 65 or over.

References

Notes

Sources

External links
Croton Township
Croton-Hardy Business Alliance

Townships in Newaygo County, Michigan
Grand Rapids metropolitan area
Townships in Michigan